Zolotonosha urban hromada is a hromada of Ukraine, in Zolotonosha Raion, Cherkasy Oblast. Its administrative center is the city of  Zolotonosha. It was formed by the government of Ukraine on 12 June 2020. Its area is 465.5 км², and its population is 35666 (as of 2020), 27664 of which lived in cities, and 8002 lived in rural areas. Current population is 

Until 18 July, 2020, the hromada belonged to Zolotonosha Municipality. As part of the administrative reform of Ukraine, which reduced the number of raions of Cherkasy Oblast to four, the municipality was merged into the Zolotonosha Raion.

Administrative structure 
One city council is in the hromada:

 Zolotonosha city council

There are five village councils:

 Blahodatnivska
 Denhivska
 Korobivska
 Kropyvnianska
 Krupska

15 settlements are in the hromada, one of which is a city:

 Zolotonosha

11 villages:

 Blahodatne
 Denhy
 Zhar
 Kedyna Hora
 Komarivka
 Korobivka
 Kropyvna
 Maliivka
 Khvylovo-Sorochyn
 Shcherbynivka

And 3 settlements:

 Hryshkivka
 Snihurivka
 Yarky

References 

2020 establishments in Ukraine
Hromadas of Zolotonosha Raion